Omosarotes ater is a species of beetle in the family Cerambycidae. It was described by Julio and Monné in 2001. It is known from Ecuador.

References

Cyrtinini
Beetles described in 2001